Ep was an unincorporated community in  Owen County, Kentucky, United States.

A post office operated in the community from 1881 to 1903. According to tradition, prominent resident Penelope Sullivan was often called 'Aunt Ep' by children who found her name hard to pronounce.

References

Unincorporated communities in Owen County, Kentucky
Unincorporated communities in Kentucky